Usheoritse Ese Itsekiri (born 31 January 1998) is a Nigerian sprinter. He was the 2018 Nigerian National Sports Festival champion and the 2019 African Games bronze medallist in the 100 metres. He also won a silver medal in the  relay at these games.

At the 2019 Nigerian Championships in Kaduna, he took both the 100 and 200 metres titles. These were his first senior national titles. This effectively ended Seye Ogunlewe's streak of three consecutive national titles in the 100 m. He had previously been the national junior champion in 2017, in a race that saw him deny Raymond Ekevwo a successful defense of the junior title.

Itsekiri competed at the 2018 Commonwealth Games in the 4x100 metres relay. He was a member of the Nigerian team that qualified for the final only to suffer disqualification. In 2018, he competed at the African Championships in Asaba, helping the Nigerian team qualify for the 4 x 100 metres relay final. Though not in the final quartet, he won a silver medal in the event as the Nigerian team placed second in the final. He also competed for Nigeria at the 2019 Yokohama World Relays in the 4 x 100 and 4 x 200 metres relay.

Itsekiri gained his first experience at international competition at the 2015 African Youth Athletics Championships in Reduit, where he finished fourth over 200 metres. He later participated in the 2015 Commonwealth Youth Games held in Apia and reached both the 100 and 200 metres semi-finals.

National Titles 
Nigerian Championships

 100 m: 2019
 200 m: 2019

Nigerian Junior Championships

 100 m: 2017

Personal bests 
100 metres: 10.02 s (Rabat 2019)

200 metres: 20.53 s (Kortrijk 2019)

4 x 100 metres relay: 38.52 s (Gold Coast 2018)

References

External links

1998 births
Living people
Nigerian male sprinters
Commonwealth Games competitors for Nigeria
Athletes (track and field) at the 2018 Commonwealth Games
Sportspeople from Delta State
Athletes (track and field) at the 2019 African Games
African Games medalists in athletics (track and field)
African Games bronze medalists for Nigeria
Athletes (track and field) at the 2020 Summer Olympics
Olympic athletes of Nigeria
21st-century Nigerian people